Sirizjan (also Romanized as Sīrīzjān; also known as Sarīzjān, Serīzjān, Sirasjūn, and Sīrīzḩān) is a village in Jereh Rural District, Jereh and Baladeh District, Kazerun County, Fars Province, Iran. At the 2006 census, its population was 680 in 164 families.

References 

Populated places in Kazerun County